The National Stadium (often referred to as the National Boxing Stadium or the National Sporting Arena) in Dublin, Ireland, is the only purpose-built boxing stadium in the world. Major General WRE Murphy, Deputy Commissioner of the Garda Síochána (police) proposed building the stadium in early 1935 and started fundraising. Built in 1939, the venue hosts over 55 days of boxing and a number of other events each year.

Venue
The stadium was opened by government minister Frank Aiken in 1939. It is owned by the Irish Amateur Boxing Association (IABA) and has been used by them for over 60 years as the venue for their national and international contests.

Music
Historically, the stadium was used as a music venue, regularly hosting bands such as Horslips, Genesis, Led Zeppelin, Thin Lizzy, U2, Van Morrison,  The Smiths, and many others. On 26 February 1980, the band U2 performed a concert at the venue which was attended by executives of Island Records; at the end of the show, the label signed the band to their first recording contract.

Facilities
The venue is situated on the South Circular Road between Clanbrassil Street to the east and Dolphin's Barn to the west. The stadium stages amateur and professional boxing and professional wrestling bouts as well as providing facilities for concerts, conferences and corporate hospitality events.

Capacity

The capacity of the stadium is 2,080 for music events, which is reduced to 1,954 for boxing and wrestling events to accommodate the boxing or wrestling ring. The Ringside club seats up to 400 people for parties or seated dining, but some junior boxing events also take place here.

Refurbishment
In December 1999, the Minister for Arts, Sports and Tourism Jim McDaid, announced a £1.3m grant under the Sports Capital Programme to undertake the refurbishment of the stadium. The two-storey building was provided with a new grey-coloured limestone facade during the refurbishment.

References

External links

List of boxing bouts and results at the National Stadium

Boxing venues in the Republic of Ireland
Buildings and structures in Dublin (city)
Boxing in Ireland
Boxing in County Dublin
Music in Dublin (city)
Sports venues in Dublin (city)
Music venues in Dublin (city)